Poul Schierbeck (8 June 1888 – 9 February 1949) was a Danish composer and organist. He was a pupil of Carl Nielsen and Thomas Laub. From 1931 he taught composition and instrumentation at the Royal Danish Academy of Music. His pupils include Axel Borup-Jørgensen, Jørgen Jersild, Leif Kayser, Svend S. Schultz, and Leif Thybo.

He composed the music for Carl Theodor Dreyer's movie Day of Wrath, and Dreyer also used his music for the movie The Word. Other works include the opera Fête galante.

References

External links
 

1888 births
1949 deaths
20th-century classical composers
Danish classical organists
Male classical organists
Danish classical composers
Danish male classical composers
Place of birth missing
Place of death missing
Pupils of Carl Nielsen
Burials at Holmen Cemetery
20th-century male musicians